The 17th Antalya Golden Orange Film Festival was a film festival scheduled to be held in Antalya, Turkey, in 1980, which was cancelled due to the declaration of martial law throughout the country following the military coup on September 12, 1980.

The awards for this and the preceding festival, which was also cancelled, re-christened Belated Golden Oranges, were presented at an award ceremony as part of the 48th International Antalya Golden Orange Film Festival, with the recipients chosen from the films originally selected as candidates by the original jury members selected to represent the competition.

The original 1980 jury was to have consisted of Orhan Aksoy, Melih Cevdet Anday, Atilla Dorsay, Kami Suveren, Ara Güler, Kenan Değer, Erkal Güngören, Doğan Hızlan, Ahmet Keskin, Ergin Orbey, Attila Özdemiroğlu, Nurettin Tekindor, Gani Turanlı, Tonguç Yaşar and Tunca Yönder.

National Feature Film Competition

Belated Golden Orange Awards 
The reconstituted National Feature Film Competition Jury, headed by Prof. Dr. Özdemir Nutku, awarded Belated Golden Oranges in eight categories.
Best Film: The Herd directed by Zeki Ökten
Best Director: Zeki Ökten for The Herd & The Enemy
Best Screenplay: Başar Sabuncu for The Sacrifice
Best Music: Zülfü Livaneli for The Herd
Best Actress: Melike Demirağ for The Herd and Güngör Bayrak for The Enemy
Best Actor: Tarık Akan for The Sacrifice & The Herd and Aytaç Arman for The Enemy
Best Supporting Actress: Fehamet Atila for The Enemy
Best Supporting Actor: Tuncel Kurtiz for The Herd

Official Selection 
Seven Turkish films made in the preceding year were selected to compete in the festival's National Feature Film Competition.
The Sacrifice directed by Atıf Yılmaz
The Herd directed by Zeki Ökten
The Enemy directed by Zeki Ökten
Doktor directed by Zeki Alasya
On Fertile Lands directed by Erden Kıral
Hasan the Rose directed by Tuncel Kurtiz
Sea Rose directed by Süreyya Duru

See also 
 1980 in film
 Turkish films of the 1980s

External links
  for the festival

References

Antalya Golden Orange Film Festival
Antalya Golden Orange Film Festival
Antalya Golden Orange Film Festival